Maschenka (Russian: Машенька, Mashen'ka; English: Mary) is a 1987 international film adaptation of the debut novel by Vladimir Nabokov, first published under his pen name V. Sirin in 1926. The film was directed by John Goldschmidt from a screenplay by John Mortimer and stars Cary Elwes as Ganin and Irina Brook as Maschenka.

Plot

The story, said by Nabokov to be semi-autobiographical, is of Lev Glebovich Ganin, a Russian émigré who has been displaced by the Russian Revolution. Now living in a boarding house in Berlin, Ganin discovers that his long-lost first love, Maschenka, is the wife of the rather unappealing boarder next door, Alfyrov, and that and she is on her way to rejoin her husband. This knowledge, combined with the incessant recitation of his memories of old Russia by another boarder, Podtyagin, sends him into a state of reverie. Ganin contrives a complex scheme in order to reunite with Maschenka, who he believes still loves him.

Cast

Production
The motion picture was filmed on location in Berlin, West Germany and in Helsinki and Katajanokka, Finland. For the sequence depicting Maschenka's arrival by train the producers rented the Russian Imperial Finnish train that once belonged to the Romanov family.

The filming was shadowed by the Chernobyl disaster. Actor Cary Elwes later recounted,

Awards
Goldschmidt won the Cine De Luca Award for Directing at the Monte Carlo TV Festival.

References

External links
Mashenka at Internet Movie Database
Mashenka at Film 4

1987 films
German romance films
German drama films
West German films
British romance films
British drama films
French romance films
French drama films
Swedish romance films
Swedish drama films
English-language German films
English-language French films
English-language Swedish films
Films based on Russian novels
Films based on works by Vladimir Nabokov
Films set in Berlin
Films set in Russia
1980s English-language films
1980s British films
1980s French films
1980s German films
1980s Swedish films